Stanley Holden (27 January 1928 – 11 May 2007), born Stanley Herbert Waller, was a British American ballet dancer and choreographer.

Born in London, he joined the Royal Ballet in 1944 and won notice for performing numerous character roles, especially "Widow Simone" in the 1960 production of La fille mal gardée by Frederick Ashton. After retiring in 1969, he moved to California to teach and perform.

He died from heart disease and colon cancer in Thousand Oaks, California in 2007, aged 79. His former wife Stella Farrance was also a dancer in the Royal Ballet.

References

External links 
 Profile of Stanley Holden Dance Center

1928 births
2007 deaths
Ballet choreographers
English male ballet dancers
British emigrants to the United States
Deaths from colorectal cancer
Deaths from cancer in California